The Carol Burnett Award is an honorary Golden Globe Award bestowed by the Hollywood Foreign Press Association (HFPA) for "outstanding contributions to television on or off the screen." The HFPA board of directors selects the honorees based on their body of work and the lasting impact that their television career achievements have had on both the industry and audiences. The award is seen as the equivalent to its film accolade counterpart, the Cecil B. DeMille Award. It was first presented at the 76th Golden Globe Awards ceremony in January 2019 and is named in honor of its first recipient, actress and trailblazer Carol Burnett.

The award has been presented annually since 2019. The youngest honoree was television writer, director, and producer Ryan Murphy, at age 57 in 2023. The oldest honoree was television writer and producer Norman Lear, at age 98 in 2021.

List of honorees

Notes

References

External links
 Official Golden Globes website

Carol Burnett Award
 
Lifetime achievement awards
Carol Burnett
Awards established in 2019